Marc Blume (born 28 December 1973 in Lüdinghausen) is a German sprinter who specialised in the 100 metres.

Biography
He is the twin brother of Holger Blume. Both represented the sports club TV Wattenscheid. With a personal best of 10.13 seconds, Blume is fifth on the German all-time list.

Achievements

See also
 German all-time top lists – 100 metres

References

External links 
 
 
 

1973 births
Living people
People from Lüdinghausen
Sportspeople from Münster (region)
German male sprinters
German national athletics champions
Olympic athletes of Germany
Athletes (track and field) at the 1996 Summer Olympics
Athletes (track and field) at the 2000 Summer Olympics
German twins
Twin sportspeople
European Athletics Championships medalists